Selander is a surname of Scandinavian origin. Notable people with the surname include:

Bjørn Selander (born 1988), American racing cyclist  
Concordia Selander (1861-1935), Swedish stage and film actress and theatre manager
Hans "Hasse" Selander (born 1945), Swedish former footballer 
Hjalmar Selander (1859 -1928), Swedish actor, stage director and theatre manager
Lesley Selander (1900-1979), American film director
Robert Selander (born 1951), American businessman, former president and chief executive officer of MasterCard 
Robert K. Selander, (1927–2015), American evolutionary biologist

See also
Selander Company, theatre company in Sweden from 1889 to 1928

Swedish-language surnames